The following is an alphabetical list of articles related to the Republic of Chile.

0–9

.cl – Internet country code top-level domain for Chile
 :1575 Valdivia earthquake
 :1730 Valparaíso earthquake
 :1835 Concepción earthquake
 :1868 Arica earthquake
 :1920 South American Championship
 :1925 Chilean coup d'état
 :1926 South American Championship
 :1941 South American Championship
 :1945 South American Championship
 :1949 Tierra del Fuego earthquake
 :1952 Ireland rugby union tour of South America
 :1954 France rugby union tour of Argentina
 :1955 South American Championship
 :1960 Valdivia earthquake
 :1962 FIFA World Cup
 :1962 FIFA World Cup qualification
 :1962 FIFA World Cup squads
 :1973 Chilean coup d'état
 :1985 Algarrobo earthquake
 :1987 FIFA World Youth Championship
 :1991 Copa América
 :1992 Galvarino
 :1997 South American Under-17 Football Championship
 :19th World Scout Jamboree
 :2000 World Junior Championships in Athletics
 :2006 student protests in Chile
 :2006–2007 Chilean corruption scandals
 :2007 Aysén Fjord earthquake
 :2007 Movistar Open
 :2009 Dakar Rally
 :2009 flu pandemic in Chile
 :2009 Movistar Open
 :2009 Movistar Open – Doubles
 :2009 Movistar Open – Singles
 :2010 American Men's Handball Championship
 :2010 Chile earthquake
 2010 Drake Passage earthquake
 :2010 Movistar Open – Doubles
 :2010 Movistar Open – Singles
 :2010 Pichilemu earthquake

A
ABC nations
Abdón Cifuentes
Abel-Nicolas Bergasse du Petit-Thouars
Abelardo Castro
Abortion in Chile
Abraham Oyanedel
ABSA - Aerolinhas Brasileiras
Academic grading in Chile
Acción Emprendedora
Achibueno
Aconcagua River
Acotango
Acuy Island
Adán Vergara
Adelardo Rodríguez
Adjacent countries:

Administradora de Fondos de Pensiones-Provida
Administrative divisions of Chile
Adolf Scherer
Adolfo Ibáñez University
Adolfo Pedernera
Adolfo Zaldívar
Adriana Delpiano
Aero Cardal
Aerovías DAP
Aextoxicon
Agrarian Labor Party
Aguardiente
Agustín Eyzaguirre
Agustín Gamarra
Agustín Ross
Architecture of Agustín Ross in Pichilemu:
Agustín Ross Balcony
Agustín Ross Cultural Center
Agustín Ross Hotel
Agustín Ross Park
Ahu Tongariki
Aisén Fjord
Aisén Province
Aisén Region
Aku-Aku
Alacalufe people
Alacalufes National Reserve
Alameda del Libertador Bernardo O'Higgins
Alan Hodgkinson
Alan Peacock
Albert Brülls
Alberto Achacaz Walakial
Alberto Bachelet
Alberto Baeza Flores
Alberto Blest Gana
Alberto de Agostini National Park
Alberto Fuguet
Alberto Guerrero
Alberto Hurtado
Alberto Hurtado University
Alberto Larraguibel
Alejandrina Cox incident
Alejandro Amenábar
Alejandro Escalona
Alejandro Jadresic
Alejandro Jodorowsky
Alejandro Selkirk Island
Alejandro Silva (musician)
Alejandro Zambra
Alerce Andino National Park
Alerce Costero Natural Monument
Alerce, Chile
Alessandri family
Alexander Witt
Alexis Sánchez (mononymous footballer "Alexis")
Alférez (rank)
Alfonso Leng
Alfonso Ugarte
Alfredo Di Stéfano
Alfredo Stroessner
Alianza Americana Anticomunista
Alianza Anticomunista Argentina
Alicanto
Alicia Kirchner
Allende family
Allende stamps
Alliance for Chile
Allipén River
Almirante class destroyer
Almirante Condell
Almirante Condell 3
Almirante Lynch
Almirante Lynch 3
Almirante Lynch class destroyer (1912)
Alonso de Ercilla y Zúñiga
Alonso de Ribera
Alonso de Sotomayor
Alonso García de Ramón
Alpaca
Alpine Air Express Chile
Altair Gomes de Figueiredo
Altiplano
Alto Biobío National Reserve
Alto de la Alianza
Alto Hospicio
Altos de Lircay National Reserve
Álvaro Fillol
Álvaro Guevara
Amalia Glacier
Ambrosio O'Higgins, 1st Marquis of Osorno
Ambrosio O'Higgins, Marquis of Osorno
Americas
South America
South Pacific Ocean
Islands of Chile
Isla Grande de Tierra del Fuego
Estrecho de Magallanes (Strait of Magellan
Mar de Hoces (Drake Passage)
Américo
Ana González Olea
Anacleto Angelini
Ancoa
Ancud
Andacollo
Andean cat
Andean condor
Andean tinamou
Andes
Andrej Kvašňák
Andrés Avelino Cáceres
Andrés Bello
Andrés de Santa Cruz
Andrés Morales
Andrés Neubauer
Andrés Pascal Allende
Andrés Wood
Andrés Zaldívar
Andrónico Luksic
Ángel Parra (singer-songwriter)
Ángel Parra Jr.
Angol
Aníbal Pinto
Aníbal Rodríguez
Anita Lizana
Anselmo Raguileo Lincopil
Antarctic flora
Antarctic Treaty System
Antártica
Antártica Chilena Province
Anticuchos
Antillanca
Antillanca ski resort
Antofagasta
Antofagasta PLC
Antofagasta Province
Antofagasta Region
Antofagasta, Chile
Antonio Carbajal
Antonio Luis Jiménez
Antonio Pareja
Antonio Prieto
Antonio Prieto (actor)
Antonio Rattín
Antonio Roma
Antonio Samoré
Antonio Skármeta
Apostolic Vicariate of Aysén
Arab Chileans
Araucanía Region
Araucanization
Araucaria
Araucaria araucana
Arauco Province
Arauco War
Archdiocese of Antofagasta
Archdiocese of Concepción, Chile (created as Diócesis de La Santísima Concepción)
Archdiocese of La Serena
Archdiocese of Puerto Montt
Archdiocese of Santiago de Chile
Archipiélago de Juan Fernández National Park
Archives of Terror
Arena Santiago
Argentina–Chile relations
Arica
Arica and Parinacota Region
Arica Province
Arica, Chile
Arica-Parinacota Region
Ariel Dorfman
Army of the Andes
Arriba en la Cordillera
Arts Faculty, Universidad de Chile
Arturo Alessandri
Arturo Frei
Arturo Godoy
Arturo Merino Benítez
Arturo Prat
Arturo Prat University
Arturo Valenzuela
ARTV (Chile)
Asado
Asociación de Guías y Scouts de Chile
Asociación Nacional de Fútbol Profesional
Astronomy in Chile
Atacama
Atacama border dispute
Atacama Department
Atacama Desert
Atacama Giant
Atacama Large Millimeter Array
Atacama Pathfinder Experiment
Atacama Region
Atacama Submillimeter Telescope Experiment
Atlas of Chile
Aucán Huilcamán
Audax Club Sportivo Italiano
Audax Italiano
Augusto Pinochet
Augusto Pinochet's arrest and trial
Australia–Chile Free Trade Agreement
Australian rules football in Chile
Austrocedrus
Austrochilidae
Austronesian people
Ayacucho Quechua
Aymara language
Aymara people
Aymoré Moreira
Azapa Valley

B
Bahá'í House of Worship
Bahia Wulaia
Baker River (Chile)
Ballet Azul
Balmaceda, Chile
Baltazar de Cordes
Baltimore Crisis
Banco Central de Chile
Banco de Chile
BAP Atahualpa
BAP Manco Cápac
Barrio Bellavista
Barrio Puerto
Barrio Suecia
Barros Jarpa
Barros Luco
Bartolomé Blanche
Bartolomé Blumenthal
Base General Bernardo O'Higgins Riquelme
Base Presidente Eduardo Frei Montalva
Basilisco Chilote
Basque Chilean
Basta (album)
Batallón de Inteligencia 601
Battle of Abtao
Battle of Angamos
Battle of Arica
Battle of Callao
Battle of Cancha Rayada
Battle of Chacabuco
Battle of Chipana
Battle of Huamachuco
Battle of Iquique
Battle of Maipú
Battle of Papudo
Battle of Pisagua
Battle of Punta Gruesa
Battle of Rancagua
Battle of San Francisco
Battle of San Juan and Chorrillos
Battle of Santiago
Battle of Tarapacá
Battle of the Maule
Battle of Topáter
Battle of Tucapel
Battle of Yungay
Batuco
Beagle Channel
Beagle Channel Arbitration
Beagle Channel cartography since 1881
Beagle conflict
Beatriz Allende
Beatriz Marinello
Beer in Chile
Benedicto Villablanca
Benjamín Vicuña Mackenna
Benjamín Vicuña MacKenna
Berberis buxifolia
Berberis darwinii
Berberis microphylla
Berberis negeriana
Bernardo Leighton
Bernardo O'Higgins
Bernardo O'Higgins National Park
Bertha Puga Martínez
Beto Cuevas
Biblioteca Nacional de Chile
Biblioteca Nacional del Perú
Biobío
Biobío Province
Biobío Region
Biobío River
Biotren
Birmingham Solar Oscillations Network
Black-necked swan
Bobby Charlton
Bobby Moore
Bobby Robson
Boldo
Bolivia–Chile relations
Bombardment of Callao
Boris Weisfeiler
Bosque de Fray Jorge National Park
Boundary treaty of 1881 between Chile and Argentina
Brazil–Chile relations
British Chilean
Brüggen Glacier
Brunswick Peninsula
Bryan Douglas
Bucalemu
Budi Lake
Buenos Aires/General Carrera Lake
Buin, Chile
Burnt Alive Case

C
C.D. Huachipato
C.D. La Serena
C.D. O'Higgins
C.D. Palestino
C.D. Universidad de Concepción
C.F. Universidad de Chile
Cabo de Hornos Biosphere Reserve
Cabo de Hornos National Park
Cabo de Hornos, Chile
Cabrero
Caburgua Lake
Cachapoal Province
Cajón del Maipo
Calama, Chile
Calbuco
Calbuco (volcano)
Calbuco Department
Caldera, Chile
Calera de Tango
Caleuche
Calfucurá
Calle 7 (TVN)
Calle-Calle River
Camahueto
Camarones (Chile)
Camerón
Cami Lake
Camilo Henríquez
Camilo Mori
Camilo Valenzuela
Camiña
Campeonato Nacional de Rodeo
Canada–Chile Free Trade Agreement
Canada–Chile relations
Canal 13 (Chile)
Canal del Fútbol (Chile)
Candelaria Perez
Candelaria Pérez
Canela, Chile
Cañal Bajo Carlos Hott Siebert Airport
Cañete, Chile
Cape Froward
Cape Horn
Cape Horn Biosphere Reserve
Capital of Chile:  Santiago
Capitan O'Brien class submarine (1928)
Capitán Pastene
Capitán Prat Province
Captain Arturo Prat Base
Captaincy General of Chile
Capture of Valdivia
Carabineros de Chile
Carahue
Caravan of Death
Cardenal Antonio Samoré Pass
Cardenal Caro Province
Carlos Altamirano
Carlos Campos Sánchez
Carlos Camus
Carlos Cardoen
Carlos Catasse
Carlos Conca
Carlos Dávila
Carlos Frödden
Carlos González Cruchaga
Carlos Ibáñez del Campo
Carlos José Castilho
Carlos Kaiser
Carlos Keller
Carlos Labrín
Carlos Lorca
Carlos Lucas
Carlos Pezoa Véliz
Carlos Pinto (journalist)
Carlos Prats
Carlos Reinoso
Carlos Sotomayor
Carlos Tejas
Carlos Torres (astronomer)
Carlos Villanueva (footballer)
Carmen Gloria Quintana
Carmen Weber
Carménère
Carolina Aguilera
Carolina Tohá
Carrán-Los Venados
Carrera family
Carretera Austral
Carriel Sur International Airport
Casa de Isla Negra
Casablanca, Chile
Casimiro Marcó del Pont
Caso Degollados
Castaño (bakery)
Casto Méndez Núñez
Castro, Chile
Catalina de Erauso
Categories:
:Category:Chile
:Category:Buildings and structures in Chile
:Category:Chile stubs
:Category:Chilean culture
:Category:Chilean people
:Category:Chile-related lists
:Category:Communications in Chile
:Category:Economy of Chile
:Category:Education in Chile
:Category:Environment of Chile
:Category:Geography of Chile
:Category:Government of Chile
:Category:Health in Chile
:Category:History of Chile
:Category:Images of Chile
:Category:Law of Chile
:Category:Military of Chile
:Category:Politics of Chile
:Category:Science and technology in Chile
:Category:Society of Chile
:Category:Sport in Chile
:Category:Transport in Chile
:Category:Transportation in Chile
commons:Category:Chile
Catholic University of the Holy Conception
Catholic University of the Maule
Catholic University of the North
Caupolican
Caupolicán
Cauquenes
Cauquenes Province
Cauquenes River
Cautín Province
Cautín River
Cazuela
CDtv
Cecilia Amenábar
Cecilia Bolocco
Cementerio General de Chile
Cementerio General de Santiago
Central Andean dry puna
Central Autónoma de Trabajadores
Central Bank of Chile
Centro Cultural Palacio de La Moneda
Cerrillos (municipality)
Cerrillos, Chile
Cerro Armazones
Cerro Azul (Chile volcano)
Cerro Bayo Complex
Cerro Castillo National Reserve
Cerro Castillo, Chile
Cerro Chaltén
Cerro Cosapilla
Cerro Escorial
Cerro Minchincha
Cerro Navia
Cerro Pantoja
Cerro Paranal
Cerro San Cristóbal
Cerro Santa Lucía
Cerro Solo
Cerro Sombrero, Chile
Cerro Tololo Inter-American Observatory
Cerro Torre
César Barros (fencer)
César Mendoza
Cesare Maldini
Cetacean Conservation Center
Ceviche
Chacabuco
Chacabuco Province
Chacao Channel
Chacao Channel bridge
Chacarero
Chaitén
Chaitén Volcano
Challenger de Providencia – Copa Cachantún
Chamanto
Chamber of Deputies of Chile
Chancaca
Chan-Chan
Chanco cheese
Chanco, Chile
Chañaral
Chañaral Island
Chañaral Province
Charles Horman
Charles W. Cole
Charlotte Lewis
Charqui
Charquicán
Chépica
Chicago Boys
Chicha
Chicharrón
Children's rights in Chile
Chile
Chile – United States Free Trade Agreement
Chile – United States relations
Chile Antarctic Geopolitics
Chile at the 1896 Summer Olympics
Chile at the 1912 Summer Olympics
Chile at the 1920 Summer Olympics
Chile at the 1924 Summer Olympics
Chile at the 1928 Summer Olympics
Chile at the 1936 Summer Olympics
Chile at the 1948 Summer Olympics
Chile at the 1948 Winter Olympics
Chile at the 1952 Summer Olympics
Chile at the 1952 Winter Olympics
Chile at the 1956 Summer Olympics
Chile at the 1956 Winter Olympics
Chile at the 1960 Summer Olympics
Chile at the 1960 Winter Olympics
Chile at the 1964 Summer Olympics
Chile at the 1964 Winter Olympics
Chile at the 1968 Summer Olympics
Chile at the 1968 Winter Olympics
Chile at the 1972 Summer Olympics
Chile at the 1976 Summer Olympics
Chile at the 1976 Winter Olympics
Chile at the 1984 Summer Olympics
Chile at the 1984 Winter Olympics
Chile at the 1988 Summer Olympics
Chile at the 1988 Winter Olympics
Chile at the 1992 Summer Olympics
Chile at the 1992 Winter Olympics
Chile at the 1994 Winter Olympics
Chile at the 1996 Summer Olympics
Chile at the 1998 Winter Olympics
Chile at the 2000 Summer Olympics
Chile at the 2002 Winter Olympics
Chile at the 2004 Summer Olympics
Chile at the 2006 Winter Olympics
Chile at the 2006 Winter Paralympics
Chile at the Olympics
Chile Chico
Chile Davis Cup team
Chile Democrático
Chile helps Chile
Chile Highway 5
Chile national basketball team
Chile national cricket team
Chile national football team
Chile national futsal team
Chile men's national handball team
Chile national rugby union team
Chile national rugby sevens team
Chile national under-17 football team
Chile national under-20 football team
Chile Open (golf)
Chile Open (tennis)
Chile Rise
Chile Student Strike of 2006
Chile under Allende
Chile under Pinochet
Chile women's national field hockey team
Chile women's national handball team
Chilean Air Force
Chilean American
Chilean angelshark
Chilean Army
Chilean Australian
Chilean battleship Almirante Latorre
Chilean Blob
Chilean Central Valley
Chilean Chess Championship
1891 Chilean Civil War
Chilean Civil War of 1829
Chilean Coast Range
Chilean Communist Party (Proletarian Action)
1980 Chilean constitutional referendum
Chilean Council of State
Chilean coup d'état, List of
Chilean coup of 1973

Chilean cuisine
Chilean Cycling Federation
Chilean Declaration of Independence
Chilean destroyer Aldea (1928)
Chilean destroyer Almirante Condell
Chilean destroyer Almirante Lynch (1912)
Chilean destroyer Hyatt (1928)
Chilean destroyer Ministro Portales
Chilean destroyer Ministro Portales (DD-17)
Chilean dolphin
Chilean dolphin
Chilean escudo
Chilean flamingo
Chilean Football Federation
Chilean football league system
Chilean Fox Terrier
Chilean frigate Almirante Condell (PFG-06)
Chilean frigate Almirante Lynch (PFG-07)
Chilean frigate Blanco Encalada (1875)
Chilean grape scare
Chilean horse
Chilean icebreaker Contraalmirante Oscar Viel Toro
Chilean Independence
Chilean Matorral
2008 Chilean municipal election
Chilean mythology
Chilean National History Museum
Chilean National Plebiscite, 1980
Chilean nationality law
Chilean nationalization of copper
Chilean Navy
1961 Chilean parliamentary election
1965 Chilean parliamentary election
1969 Chilean parliamentary election
1973 Chilean parliamentary election
2005 Chilean parliamentary election
2009 Chilean parliamentary election
Chilean people
Chilean peso
1989 Chilean political reform referendum
Chilean political scandals
1826 Chilean presidential election
1827 Chilean presidential election
1829 Chilean presidential election
1831 Chilean presidential election
1836 Chilean presidential election
1841 Chilean presidential election
1846 Chilean presidential election
1851 Chilean presidential election
1856 Chilean presidential election
1861 Chilean presidential election
1866 Chilean presidential election
1871 Chilean presidential election
1876 Chilean presidential election
1881 Chilean presidential election
1886 Chilean presidential election
July 1891 Chilean presidential election
October 1891 Chilean presidential election
1896 Chilean presidential election
1901 Chilean presidential election
1906 Chilean presidential election
1910 Chilean presidential election
1915 Chilean presidential election
1920 Chilean presidential election
1925 Chilean presidential election
1927 Chilean presidential election
1931 Chilean presidential election
1932 Chilean presidential election
1938 Chilean presidential election
1942 Chilean presidential election
1946 Chilean presidential election
1952 Chilean presidential election
1958 Chilean presidential election
1964 Chilean presidential election
1970 Chilean presidential election
1989 Chilean presidential election
1993 Chilean presidential election
1999–2000 Chilean presidential election
1999–2000 Chilean presidential election
2005–06 Chilean presidential election
2005–06 Chilean presidential election
2009–10 Chilean presidential election
2009–10 Chilean presidential election
Chilean Primera División
Chilean Quechua
Chilean recluse
Chilean Resistance
Chilean Revolution of 1829
Chilean rock
Chilean rodeo
Chilean rose tarantula
Chilean salad
Chilean school uniform
Chilean Sea
Chilean ship Almirante Latorre
Chilean ship Blanco Encalada
Chilean ship Cochrane
Chilean Sign Language
Chilean skua
Chilean Spanish
Chilean tinamou
Chilean Traditional Universities
Chilean transition to democracy
Chilean War of Independence
Chilean wine
Chilean-Greek relations
Chilean–Peruvian maritime dispute of 2006–2007
Chile–Finland relations
Chile–India relations
Chile–Peru relations
ChilePuede
Chile–Turkey relations
Chilevisión
Chili Gulch
Chillán
Chiloé Archipelago
Chiloé Island
Chiloé National Park
Chiloé Province
Chilöe wigeon
Chilotan architecture
Chilote mythology
Chilote Spanish
Chimbarongo
Chincha Islands War
Chinese people in Chile
Choapa Province
Choco Panda
Chon languages
Chonchi
Chonchón
Chonos Archipelago
Choripán
Chorus giganteus
Christ the Redeemer of the Andes
Christian Castañeda
Christian Democrat Party of Chile
Christian Left Party (Chile)
Christina Montt
Chungará Lake
Chupalla
Chuquicamata
Churches of Chiloé
Churrasco
Churro
City of the Caesars
Civil Code (Chile)
Clandestine in Chile
Clara Solovera
Clarence Acuña
Claudia Acuña
Cláudio Andrés Maldonado
Claudio Arrau
Claudio Barrientos
Claudio Bravo (painter)
Claudio Bravo (footballer)
Claudio Bunster
Claudio Huepe
Claudio Maldonado
Claudio Naranjo
Claudio Narea
Claudio Parra
Claudio Valenzuela
Clemente de Lantaño
Climate of Chile
Clodomiro Almeyda
Club de Deportes Antofagasta
Club de Deportes La Serena
Club de Deportes Puerto Montt
Club de Deportes Santiago Morning
Club de Deportes Santiago Wanderers
Club de Deportes Temuco
Club Deportes Cobresal
Club Deportivo Ferroviario Almirante Arturo Fernández Vial
Club Deportivo Huachipato
Club Deportivo O'Higgins
Club Deportivo Palestino
Club Deportivo Universidad Católica
Club Deportivo Universidad de Concepción
Club Social de Deportes Rangers
Club Social de Deportes Rangers de Talca
Coalition (Chile)
Coalition for Change
Coalition of Parties for Democracy

Cobquecura
Cobreloa
Cochamó
Cochrane, Chile
Codegua
Codelco
Codpa
Coi Coi-Vilu
Coihaique
Coihaique Province
Coihue
Coínco
Colbún
Colbún Lake
Colchagua Province
Colchane
Colegio de la Preciosa Sangre de Pichilemu
Colegio del Verbo Divino
Colico Lake
Colina, Chile
Collipulli
Colo Colo (mythology)
Colo-Colo
Colo-Colo season 2007
Colo Colo season 2008
Colo-Colo season 2009
Colo-Colo season 2010
Colocolo (tribal chief)
Colombina Parra
Colonia Dignidad
Coltauco
Combarbalá
Communes of Chile
Communications in Chile
Communist Left (Chile)
Communist Party of Chile
Comodoro Arturo Merino Benítez International Airport
Compañía Chilena de Televisión
Concepción Province, Chile
Concepción, Chile
Concert of Parties for Democracy
Concha y Toro
Concha y Toro Winery
Conchalí
Concholepas concholepas
Condorito
Confidence-building measures in South America
Conguillío Lake
Conguillío National Park
Cono Sur Vineyards & Winery
Conservative Party (Chile)
Constitución, Chile
Constitution of Chile
Contulmo
Coordination of United Revolutionary Organizations
Copahue
Copec
Copesa
Copiapó
Copiapó Province
Copiapó River
Copihue
Coquimbo
Coquimbo Region
Coquimbo Unido
Corcovado National Park (Chile)
Cordillera Darwin
Cordillera de Mahuidanchi
Cordillera de Nahuelbuta
Cordillera de Talinay
Cordillera del Paine
Cordillera Province, Chile
Cordón del Azufre
CORFO
Coronel, Chile
Corporación Deportiva Everton de Viña del Mar
Corral Bay
Corral Bay Forts
Corral, Chile
Corvo (knife)
Coscoroba swan
Cosmic Background Imager
Costanera Center
Covadonga (ship)
Coyhaique
Coyhaique Province
Crescente Errázuriz
Cristian Álvarez
Cristián Castañeda
Cristián de la Fuente
Cristo Redentor Tunnel
Crossing of the Andes
Crudos
Cruz del Tercer Milenio
CSAV
Cucalón (comic strip)
Cueca
Cueva del Milodón Natural Monument
Cuisine of Chile
Culpeo
Culture of Chile
Curacautín
Curaco de Vélez
Curanipe
Curanto
Curarrehue
Curepto
Curicó
Curicó Province
Curtis Warren Kamman
Cyrus Vance
Cyttaria espinosae

D
Dagoberto Godoy
Dalcahue
Daniela Castillo
Darwin Sound
Darwin's fox
Dassault Mirage 5
David Arellano
David H. Popper
David Moya
David Pizarro
David Rosenmann-Taub
Dawson Island
Day of the Youth Combatant
De la Laguna River
Deal or No Deal (Chile)
Decipherment of rongorongo
Degu
Del Toro Lake
Delfina Guzmán
Democratic Alliance (Chile)
Demographics of Chile
Deportes Antofagasta
Deportes Puerto Montt
Deportes Valdivia
Derek Kevan
Desventuradas Islands
Diablada
Diaguita
Diamela Eltit
Diana Bolocco
Dichato
Dickson Lake
Diego Barros Arana
Diego de Almagro
Diego Portales
Diego Portales University
Diego Ramírez Islands
Dimitar Yakimov
DINA
Diocese of Arica
Diocese of Chillán
Diocese of Copiapó
Diocese of Iquique
Diocese of La Santísima Concepción
Diocese of La Santísima Concepción, Chile
Diocese of Linares
Diocese of Los Ángeles
Diocese of Melipilla
Diocese of Osorno
Diocese of Punta Arenas
Diocese of Rancagua
Diocese of San Bernardo, Chile
Diocese of San Carlos de Ancud
Diocese of San Felipe, Chile
Diocese of Talca
Diocese of Temuco (disambiguation)
Diocese of Valdivia
Diocese of Valparaíso (disambiguation)
Diocese of Villarrica
Dirección de los Servicios de Inteligencia y Prevención
Direct negotiations between Chile and Argentina in 1977–1978
Direct negotiations between Chile and Argentina in 1977-78
Dirty War
Disaster of Curalaba
Disaster of Rancagua
Distribución y Servicio
División Mayor del Básquetbol de Chile
Djalma Santos
Domingo Eyzaguirre
Domingo Ortiz de Rosas
Domingo Ortíz de Rosas, 1st Marquis of Poblaciones
Domingo Santa María
Don Francisco (television host)
Don Howe
Doñihue
Dragoslav Šekularac
Drake Passage
Dražan Jerković
Drimys
Dulce de membrillo
Dutch Chilean
Dutch colonization of the Americas

E
Easter Island
Ecologist Party (Chile)
Economic history of Chile
Economy of Chile
Ed Koch
Edmundo Searle
Eduardo Abaroa
Eduardo Alquinta
Eduardo Barrios
Eduardo Bonvallet
Eduardo Carrasco
Eduardo Frei Montalva
Eduardo Frei Ruiz-Tagle
Eduardo Gatti
Eduardo Lobos
Eduardo Parra
Eduardo Parra Pizarro
Education in Chile
Edward M. Korry
Efrain Díaz
El Bosque (municipality, Chile)
El Bosque, Chile
El Derecho de Vivir en Paz (album)
El Diario Austral de Valdivia
El Loa Province
El Manzano (prison)
El Mercurio
El Monte, Chile
El Morado Natural Monument
El Naveghable
El pueblo unido jamás será vencido
El Salvador mine
El Salvador, Chile
El Siglo
El Tamarugal Province
El Tatio
El Teniente
El Tepual Airport
El Toqui mine
El Yali National Reserve
Elections in Chile
Electoral divisions of Chile
Elegant crested tinamou
Elevenses
Elías Figueroa
Elicura Chihuailaf
Eliodoro Yáñez
Eliseo Salazar
Elqui Province
Elqui River
Ely Tacchella
Embassy of Chile, Ottawa
Embothrium
Emiliano Figueroa
Empanada
Empedrado, Chile
Empedrado, Talca
Emperor penguin
Empresas Copec
ENAER Pantera
English Chilean
English Opens Doors
Enrico Albertosi
Enrique Balmaceda
Enrique Cood
Entel (Chile)
Entel PCS
Erasmo Escala
Eric Goles
Erik Bongcam-Rudloff
Escondida
Esmeralda (BE-43)
Estación Central
Estación Central railway station
Estación Mapocho
Estadio Bicentenario de La Florida
Estadio Carlos Dittborn
Estadio de Hanga Roa
Estadio El Cobre
Estadio El Teniente
Estadio Fiscal
Estadio Fiscal de Talca
Estadio Francisco Sánchez Rumoroso
Estadio La Portada
Estadio Las Higueras
Estadio Monumental David Arellano
Estadio Municipal de Calama
Estadio Municipal de Concepción
Estadio Municipal de La Florida
Estadio Municipal Francisco Sánchez Rumoroso
Estadio Nacional de Chile
Estadio Playa Ancha
Estadio Regional Chiledeportes
Estadio Regional de Antofagasta
Estadio Regional de Chinquihue
Estadio San Carlos de Apoquindo
Estadio Santa Laura
Estadio Santiago Bueras
Estadio Sausalito
Estadio Víctor Jara
Estero Calbuco
Etc...TV
Eucryphia
Eugenia Errázuriz
Eulogio Martínez
European Extremely Large Telescope
European Southern Observatory
Everton de Viña del Mar
Ex Congreso Nacional
Extreme points of Chile

F
Fabián Estay
Fagnano Lake
Fahrenheit (Chilean band)
Faja Maisan
Falabella
False Cape Horn
Falso Azufre
FAMAE FD-200
Fatherland and Liberty
Faustino Asprilla
Federación de Fútbol de Chile
Federico Errázuriz Echaurren
Federico Errázuriz Zañartu
Federico Santa María
Federico Santa María Technical University
Felipe Barral Momberg
Felipe Seymour
Ferenc Puskás
Fernando Cornejo
Fernando Errázuriz Aldunate
Fernando Flores
Fernando González
Fernando Krahn
Fernando Matthei
Fernando Solis
Fernando Solís
Ferrocarril de Antofagasta a Bolivia
Fiestas Patrias (Chile)
Fitzroya
Flag of Chile 
Flórián Albert
Floribella
Flying steamer duck
Fog collection
Football in Chile
Forced disappearance
Foreign relations of Chile
Fort Bulnes
Fortín Mapocho
Francisco Antonio Encina
Francisco Antonio García Carrasco
Francisco Antonio Pinto
Francisco Bolognesi
Francisco Coloane
Francisco de Aguirre
Francisco de Aguirre (conquistador)
Francisco de la Lastra
Francisco de Meneses Brito
Francisco de Villagra
Francisco Gento
Francisco Hudson
Francisco Ibáñez de Peralta
Francisco Javier Errázuriz Talavera
Francisco Javier Errázuriz Ossa
Francisco Javier Errázuriz Talavera
Francisco Laso de la Vega
Francisco López de Zúñiga
Francisco López de Zúñiga, 2nd Marquis of Baides
Francisco Maldonado da Silva
Francisco Marcó del Pont
Francisco Nef
Francisco Ramón Vicuña
Francisco Rojas
Francisco Ruiz-Tagle
Francisco Varela
Francoaceae
FRAP (Chile)
Frei family
French Chilean
Frutillar
Fuegians
Fundación Chile
Futaleufú River
Futrono

G
Gabino Gaínza
Gabriel Cano de Aponte
Gabriel Donoso
Gabriel González Videla
Gabriel Guerra-Mondragón
Gabriel Parra
Gabriel Salazar
Gabriela Mistral
Gabriela Mistral University
Galvarino
García Hurtado de Mendoza, 5th Marquis of Cañete
García Hurtado de Mendoza, Marquis of Cañete
Garrincha
Gaucho
Gay rights in Chile
Gemini Observatory
General Bernardo O'Higgins Airport
General Carrera Lake
General Carrera Province
General Lagos
Geoffroy's cat
Geography of Chile
Geology of Chile
George Eastham
George Robledo
George W. Landau
Georgi Asparuhov
Geothermal power in Chile
German Casas
Germán Casas
German Chilean
Germán Riesco
Gerry Hitchens
Gert Weil
Giacomo Bulgarelli
Gianni Rivera
Giant Magellan Telescope
Gilmar
Giovanni Ferrari
Giovanni Trapattoni
Gladys Marín
Gomortega
Gondwana (Chilean band)
Gonzalo Jara
Gonzalo Lira
Gonzalo Rojas
Gordon Banks
Government Juntas of Chile
Government Junta of Chile (1810)
Government Junta of Chile (1823)
Government Junta of Chile (1829)
Government Junta of Chile (1891)
Government Junta of Chile (1924)
Government Junta of Chile (1925)
Government Junta of Chile (1932)
Government Junta of Chile (1973)
Government Junta of Chile (August 1811)
Government Junta of Chile (December 1811)
Government Junta of Chile (November 1811)
Gracias a la Vida (charity song)
Graneros
Great Chilean earthquake
Greater Iquique
Greater Valparaíso
Greeks in Chile
Green Party of Chile
Green-backed firecrown
Gregorio Billikopf
Grey Lake
Grey River (Chile)
Grupo Montparnasse
Guafo Island
Guanaco
Guanaqueros
Guaraculén
Guayaneco Archipelago
Guillermo "Willy" Oddó
Guitarrón chileno
Gulf of Ancud
Gulf of Corcovado
Gulf of Penas
Gustavo Becerra-Schmidt
Gustavo Leigh
Gyula Grosics

H
Haig's tuco-tuco
Halcones
Hallulla
Hanga Roa
Hans Gildemeister
Hans Schäfer
Hans Tilkowski
Hardy Peninsula
Health care in Chile
Hector Tapia
Héctor Tapia
Heinz Schneiter
Helenio Herrera
Helio Gallardo
Helmut Haller
Helvecia Viera
Henry Kissinger
Heraldo Muñoz
Herbert Erhardt
Herminia Arrate
Hermite Islands
Hermogenes Valdebenito
Hernán Neira
Héroes (Chilean miniseries)
Hetroertzen
Hiking in Chile
Hil Hernández
Hilarión Daza
Hilderaldo Bellini
Himno Nacional de Chile
Hipodromo Chile
Hispanic
Hispanidad
Hispanophone
History of Chile
History of Chile during the Parliamentary Era (1891–1925)
History of Easter Island
HMS Antrim (D18)
HMS Glamorgan (D19)

HMS Grafton (F80)
HMS Norfolk (F230)
HMS Sheffield (F96)
Holland 602 type submarine
Honorino Landa
Horacio Salinas
Horacio Troche
Horatio Sanz
Hornopirén National Park
Hornos Island
Horst Szymaniak
Hortensia Bussi
Hospital Carlos Van Buren
Hospital del Tórax
Hoste Island
Hotel Hanga Roa
Hotu Matu'a
Hualaihué
Hualañé
Huara
Huáscar (ship)
Huasco Province
Huasco, Chile
Huaso
Huaso (horse)
Huechuraba
Huemul (zoology)
Huerquehue National Park
Huerta del Maule
Huillac Ñusca
Huillice language
Huilliche
Huilliche language
Huinay
Human rights in Chile
Human trafficking in Chile
Humanist Party (Chile)
Humanitarian response to the 2010 Chile earthquake
Humberstone and Santa Laura Saltpeter Works
Humberto Maschio
Humberto Maturana
Humberto Nilo
Humboldt penguin
Humita
Hungarians in Chile

I
Ibero-America
Ibero-American Summit
Iglesia de la Matriz
Ignacio Carrera Pinto
Ignacy Domeyko
Igor Chislenko
Ildefonso Islands
Illapel
Illapu
Imbunche
Immigration to Chile
In Patagonia
Incahuasi
Independencia, Chile
Independent Democrat Union
Independent Liberal Party (Chile)
Indigenous peoples in Chile
Inés de Suárez
Inés Suárez
Informe especial
Ingrid Antonijevic
Instituto Antártico Chileno
Instituto Nacional
Instituto O'Higgins, Rancagua
Intermediate Depression
International Organization for Standardization (ISO)
ISO 3166-1 alpha-2 country code for Chile: CL
ISO 3166-1 alpha-3 country code for Chile: CHL
ISO 3166-2:CL region codes for Chile
International rankings of Chile
Internet in Chile
Inti-Illimani
Invunche
Iquique
Iquique Province
Irruputuncu
Isabel Allende
Isabel Allende (politician)
Isabel Parra
Isidoro Dubournais
Isla Chañaral
Isla Grande de Tierra del Fuego
Isla Magdalena National Park
Isla Navarino
Isla Salas y Gómez
Islam in Chile
Islands of Chile
Islotes de Puñihuil Natural Monument
Israel Polack
Isthmus of Ofqui
Italian Chilean
Itata River
Iván Morovic
Iván Zamorano

J
Jacqueline van Rysselberghe
Jaime Collyer
Jaime Fillol
Jaime Guzmán
James D. Theberge
James's flamingo
Jan Lála
Ján Popluhár
Japanese Chilean
Javier Margas
Javiera Carrera
Javiera Parra
Jerónimo Méndez
Jéssica Eterovic
Jimmy Armfield
Jimmy Greaves
Joaquín Larraín Gandarillas
Joaquín Lavín
Joaquín Peiró
Joaquín Toesca
Joel Roberts Poinsett
John Connelly (footballer, born 1938)
John Dinges
John O'Leary (ambassador)
John Thomas North
John Williams Wilson
Johnnathan Tafra
Johnny Haynes
Jonnathan Tafra
Jorge Alessandri
Jorge Edwards
Jorge Garcia
Jorge Garretón
Jorge González von Marées
Jorge Medina Estévez
Jorge Montt
Jorge Peña Hen
Jorge Quinteros
Jorge Quinteros (mountaineer)
Jorge Rafael Videla
Jorge Urrutia
Jorge Valdivia
José A. Santos
José Alejandro Bernales
José Altafini
José Antonio Pareja
Jose Antonio Vidaurre
José Antonio Vidaurre
José Arraño Acevedo
José Ballivián
José Bohr
José de Garro
José de la Riva Agüero
José de San Martín
José de Santiago Concha
José Donoso
José Ely de Miranda
José Fernando de Abascal y Sousa
José Ignacio Zenteno
José Joaquín Pérez
José Joaquín Prieto
José López Rega
José Luis Sierra
José Luis Villanueva
José Macia
José Manuel Balmaceda
José Manuel Pareja
José María Vélaz
José Miguel Carrera
José Miguel Contreras
José Miguel Infante
José Miguel Insulza
José Pedro Fuenzalida
José Piñera
José Rafael Balmaceda
José Santamaría
José Tadeo Mancheño
José Tohá
José Tomás Ovalle
José Toribio Medina
José Toribio Merino
José Zalaquett
Josef Jelínek
Josef Kadraba
Josef Masopust
Josip Skoblar
Jozef Adamec
Jozef Bomba
Juan Andrés de Ustariz
Juan Antonio Pezet
Juan Antonio Ríos
Juan Carlos Carbonell
Juan Carlos Latorre
Juan Carlos Lorenzo
Juan Claudio González
Juan Downey
Juan Emilio Cheyre
Juan Esteban Montero
Juan Fernández Islands
Juan Francisco Salazar
Juan Guzmán Tapia
Juan Ignacio Molina
Juan José Latorre
Juan José Torres
Juan Jufré
Juan Luis Sanfuentes
Juan Mackenna
Juan Maino
Juan Manuel Pareja
Juan Martinez de Rozas
Juan Martínez de Rozas
Juan Orrego-Salas
Juan Pablo II Bridge
Juan Quiroga (footballer, born 1973)
Juan Somavía
Juan Subercaseaux
Juan Williams Rebolledo
Juan Zanelli
Juana Rosa Aguirre
Juanita Parra
Judiciary of Chile
Julio Canessa
Julio Moreno (fencer)
Juntas de Abastecimientos y Precios
Juntos PODEMOS Más
Juvencio Valle

K
Kakauhua language
Kalimotxo
Kalku
Katalalixar National Reserve
Kawésqar language
Kelp goose
Kenneth Maxwell
Kiltro
King penguin
Kingdom of Araucania and Patagonia
Klaus Junge
Klaus von Storch
Kodkod
Kuchen
Kudai

L
La Araucana
La Calera, Chile
La Campana National Park
La Campana-Peñuelas
La Cisterna
La Cuarta
La Dehesa
La Estrella, Chile
La Florida, Chile
La Granja, Chile
La Ley (band)
La Moneda Palace
La Nación (Chile)
La Negra Antofagasta
La Pintana
La Población
La Portada
La Prensa de Curicó
La Red (Chilean television)
La Reina
La Segunda
La Serena, Chile
La Silla Observatory
La Tercera
La Unión, Chile
Ladeco
Ladislao Cabrera
Ladislav Novák
Lady P
Lago Jeinimeni National Reserve
Lago Ranco, Chile
Laguna Blanca, Chile
Laguna del Laja
Laguna del Laja National Park
Laguna San Rafael National Park
Laguna Verde (lake of Chile)
Laguna Verde, Chile
Lahuen Ñadi Natural Monument
Laja Falls
Laja River (Chile)
Lajos Baróti
Lajos Tichy
Lake Ballivián
Lake Chungará
Lake Huechulafquen
Lake Llanquihue
Lake Villarrica
Lampa, Chile
LAN Cargo
LAN Chile Cargo
LAN Express
Lanco, Chile
Languages of Chile
Lanin
Lanín
Laraquete
Lardizabala
Large Synoptic Survey Telescope
Las Cabras
Las Campanas Observatory
Las Chinchillas National Reserve
Las Condes
Las Marías Airport
Las películas de mi vida
Las Últimas Noticias
Las Vicuñas National Reserve
Lascar Volcano
Lastarria
LATAM Airlines
LATAM Airlines destinations
LATAM Ecuador
LATAM Perú
Latin America
Latin American involvement in international peacekeeping
Lauca
Lauca National Park
Laura Rodríguez
Lautaro (toqui)
Lautaro, Chile
Lautaro (volcano)
Law of Chile
Legend of Trentren Vilu and Caicai Vilu
Lemuy Island
Lenga beech
Leonardo Farkas
Leonel Sánchez
Leonor Oyarzún
Leonor Varela
Leopoldo O'Donnell, 1st Duke of Tetuan
Lesbos in love
Lev Yashin
LGBT rights in Chile
Liberal Alliance (1891)
Liberal Democratic Party (Chile)
Liberal Party (Chile, 1849–1966)
Liberal Party (Chile, 2007–)
Liberal Party of Chile
Liberal–Conservative Fusion
Liberal-Conservative Fusion (Chile)
Liberalism and radicalism in Chile
Licán Ray
Licancabur
Licantén
Líder
Liga Chilena de Fútbol: Primera División
Limarí Province
Linares Province
Linares, Chile
Point Lengua de Vaca
Liquiñe-Ofqui Fault
Lists related to Chile:
List of diplomatic missions of Chile
List of Ambassadors from New Zealand to Chile
List of Biosphere Reserves in Chile
List of Chilean artists
List of Chilean chess champions
List of Chilean companies
List of Chilean flags
List of Chilean freeways
List of Chilean Jews
List of Chilean magazines
List of Chilean newspapers
List of Chilean submissions for the Academy Award for Best Foreign Language Film
List of Chilean television channels
List of Chileans
List of Chile-related topics
List of cities in Chile
List of diplomatic missions in Chile
List of earthquakes in Chile
List of expressways in Chile
List of football clubs in Chile
List of Government Juntas of Chile
List of highways in Chile
List of hospitals in Chile
List of islands of Chile
List of lakes in Chile
List of Mapudungun placenames
List of mountains in Chile
List of national parks of Chile
List of people on stamps of Chile
List of political parties in Chile
List of rivers of Chile
List of town tramway systems in Chile
List of towns in Chile
List of universities in Chile
List of Valparaíso metro stations
List of volcanoes in Chile
Timeline of Chilean history
Topic outline of Chile
Litueche
Lizardo Montero Flores
Llaima
Llano de Chajnantor Observatory
Llanquihue Lake
Llanquihue Province
Llanquihue, Chile
Llullaillaco
Llullaillaco National Park
Lo Barnechea
Lo Espejo
Lo Prado
Loa River
Locro
Lolol
Loncoche
Loncomilla River
Longaniza
Longaví
Longaví River
Long-nosed shrew opossum
Lonko
Lonquimay
Lope García de Castro
Lorenzo Buffon
Lorenzo de Arrau
Los Álamos
Los Andes Province, Chile
Los Andes, Chile
Los Ángeles
Los de Abajo
Los de Ramón
Los Flamencos National Reserve
Los Jaivas
Los Lagos Region
Los Lagos, Chile
Los Miserables (band)
Los Pingüinos Natural Monument
Los Prisioneros
Los Ríos Region
Los Ruiles
Los Ruiles National Reserve
Los Tetas
Los Tres
Los Twisters
Los Vilos
Lota Schwager
Lota, Chile
Lucho Gatica
Lucía Hiriart
Lucía Hiriart de Pinochet
Lucybell
Luis Advis
Luis Altamirano
Luis Antonio Jiménez
Luis Carrera
Luis Corvalán
Luís Cubilla
Luis Eyzaguirre
Luis Gatica
Luis José de Orbegoso
Luis Merlo de la Fuente
Luis Musrri
Luis Otero Mujica
Luis Posada Carriles
Luis Sepúlveda
Luis Suárez Miramontes
Luisa Durán
Luma apiculata
Luma chequen

M
Macaroni penguin
Machalí
Machi (shaman)
Machuca
Macul
Máfil
Magallanes and Antartica Chilena Region
Magallanes Province
Magallanes and Antartica Chilena Region
Magdalena Island, Aisén Region
Magdalena Island, Magallanes Region
Magdalena Petit
Magellan Telescopes
Magellanic penguin
Magellanic subpolar forests
Maihue Lake
Maipo (volcano)
Maipo Province
Maipo River
Maipú (municipality)
Maipú, Chile
Maitland Plan
Makemake (mythology)
Malalcahuello-Nalcas
Malleco Province
Malleco River
Malleco Viaduct
Malloa
Manfred Max-Neef
Manifiesto (Víctor Jara album)
Manjar
Manjar blanco
Manuel Antonio Caro
Manuel Baquedano
Manuel Barañao
Manuel Blanco Encalada
Manuel Bulnes
Manuel Contreras
Manuel de Amat y Juniet
Manuel Ignacio de Vivanco
Manuel Jacques
Manuel Montt
Manuel Negrete (human rights victim)
Manuel Negrete (shooting)
Manuel Neira
Manuel Ortiz de Zárate
Manuel Pellegrini
Manuel Plaza
Manuel Recabarren
Manuel Rodríguez Erdoiza
Manuel Rodríguez Patriotic Front
Manuel Rojas (footballer)
Manutara
Mapocho River
Mapuche
Mapuche conflict
Mapuche religion
Mapudungun
Maquehue Airport
Marcelo Ramírez
Marcelo Ríos
Marcelo Salas
Marcelo Vega
March 2010 Chile blackout
Marchihue
Marco Bechis
Marcos González
Marga Marga Province
Margot Loyola
María Elena
María José Urzúa
María Luisa Bombal
Mariana de Aguirre
Mariano Bustamante
Mariano Ignacio Prado
Mariano Melgarejo
Mariano Osorio
Marie Ann Salas
Marinelli Glacier
Mario Benavides Soto
Mario Cáceres
Mario David (footballer)
Mario Esteban Berrios
Mario Mutis
Mario Salgado
Mario Soto (footballer, born 1933)
Mario Soto (footballer, born 1950)
Mário Zagallo
Mark González
Marlene Ahrens
Marmaduque Grove
Marmolejo
Marta Larraechea
Marta Pizarro Véliz
Martín Almada
Martín García Óñez de Loyola
Martin Gusinde
Martín Ruiz de Gamboa
Martín Vargas
Massacre of Seguro Obrero
Matanzas, Chile
Mataquito River
Mataveri International Airport
Mate (beverage)
Mateo de Toro y Zambrano
Mateo de Toro Zambrano, 1st Count of la Conquista
Mathias Klotz
Matias Brain
Matías Fernández
Matilde Urrutia
Maui Gayme
Maule Region
Maule River
Maule, Chile
Maullín
Maurice Norman
Mauricio Aros
Mauricio Pinilla
Mauricio Rosenmann Taub
Mauro Ramos
Máximo Carvajal
Medialuna
Medialuna de Osorno
Medialuna Monumental de Rancagua
Mejillones
Melado River
Melchor Bravo de Saravia
Melchor de Concha y Toro
Melipeuco
Melipilla
Melipilla Province
Melitón Carvajal
Memo Aguirre
Mercedes Fontecilla
Metropolitan University of Educational Sciences
Metropolitan University of Technology
Metrotrén
Michael Townley
Michelle Bachelet
Michimalonco
Miguel Arteche
Miguel Enríquez
Miguel Enríquez Espinosa
Miguel Grau Seminario
Miguel Iglesias
Miguel Littin
Miguel Littín
Miguel Piñera
Miguel Ramírez
Miguel Serrano
Mijal Nathalie Sapoznik
Milan Galić
Military Bishopric of Chile
Military of Chile
Millalelmo
Milovan Mirosevic
Milton Friedman
Mining in Chile
Ministry General Secretariat of Government (Chile)
Ministry General Secretariat of the Presidency (Chile)
Ministry of Economy, Development and Tourism
Ministry of Education (Chile)
Ministry of Foreign Affairs (Chile)
Ministry of National Defense (Chile)
Ministry of the Interior (Chile)
Miracle of Chile
Miss Chile
Miss World Chile
Missing (1982 film)
Mitraria
Moai
Mocha (island)
Mocha Island
Mocho-Choshuenco National Reserve
Moisés Villarroel
Molina, Chile
Monito del monte
Monna Bell
Monte Fitz Roy
Monte Patria
Monte San Lorenzo
Monte San Valentin
Monte Verde
Montemar Institute of Marine Biology
Montoneros
Montt family
Monturaqui crater
Moraleda Channel
Morandé 80
Mostazal
Mote con huesillo
Motu Nui
Mount Darwin (Andes)
Mount Hudson
Mount Tarn
Movistar Arena
Mulchén
Multivia
Municipalities of Chile
Murta con membrillo
Murtado
Music of Chile
Music of Easter Island
Myrceugenia

N
Nacimiento, Chile
Nahuelbuta National Park
Nancagua
NANTEN2 Observatory
Narciso Campero
Nathaniel Davis
National Alliance of Independents
National Anthem of Chile
National Congress of Chile
National Council of Culture and the Arts
National Library of Peru
National Monuments of Chile
National Party (Chile)
National Party (Chile, 1857–1933)
National Party (Chile, 1966–1973)
National Prize of Art of Chile
National Renewal (Chile)
National Socialist Movement of Chile
National Women's Service
Natural regions of Chile
Naval de Talcahuano
Navarino Island
Navidad, Chile
Navimag
Nelly Richard
Nelson Acosta
Nelson Parraguez
Nelson Tapia
Neltume, Chile
Nemoroso Riquelme
Néstor Kirchner
Nevado de Longaví
Nevado San Francisco
Nevado Tres Cruces
Nevado Tres Cruces National Park
Nevados de Payachata
Nevados de Quimsachata
Ngen
Nguruvilu
Nicanor Parra
Nicolás Córdova
Nicolás de Piérola
Nicolás Eyzaguirre
Nicolás Massú
Nicolás Millán
Nicolás Peric
Nicolasa Valdés
Nicole
Nicole Perrot
Nido de Aguilas
Niebla
Niebla, Chile
Nilahue River
Nílton Santos
Nirivilo
Nirivilo, Chile
No Quiero Escuchar Tu Voz
Nolana
Nordenskjöld Lake
Norte Chico, Chile
Norte Grande
Norte Grande insurrection
Northern Patagonian Ice Field
Nothofagus
Nothofagus antarctica
Nothofagus dombeyi
Nueva canción
Nueva Extremadura
Nueva Imperial
Nueva Toltén
Ñiquén
Ñuble Province
Ñuñoa
Ñusta Huillac

O
Obesity in Chile
Occupation of Araucanía
Occupation of Lima
O'Higgins (Chilean frigate)
O'Higgins Glacier
O'Higgins Park
O'Higgins Region
O'Higgins/San Martín Lake
Ojos del Caburgua
Ojos del Salado
Olca
Olivar
Ollagüe
Ollagüe, Chile
Omar Sivori
Ona language
Operation Colombo
Operation Condor
Operation Toucan (KGB)
Operation TOUCAN (KGB)
Óptima Televisión
Order of the Merit of Chile
Orelie-Antoine de Tounens
Orelie-Antoine I of Araucania and Patagonia
Orlando Bosch
Orlando Letelier
Oscar Cristi
Oscar Hahn
Óscar Hahn
Oscar Lopez
Oscar Novoa
Osorno (volcano)
Osorno Province
Osorno, Chile
Osvaldo Andrade
Osvaldo Nunez
Osvaldo Romo
Otto Reich
Ovalle

P
Pablo Neruda
Pacific Ocean
Pacific Ring of Fire
Pacific Station
Paila marina
Paillaco
Palafito
Palena Province
Palena/General Vintter Lake
Palestinian community in Chile
Pali-Aike National Park
Pali-Aike Volcanic Field
Palmilla
Pampa del Tamarugal National Reserve
Pampas cat
Pampas fox
Pan de Azúcar National Park
Pan-American Highway (South America)
Panguipulli
Panguipulli Lake
Panhispanism
Panquehue (cheese)
Papa rellena
Papal mediation in the Beagle conflict
Papelucho
Paranal Mountain
Paranal Observatory
Paredones
Parinacota Volcano
Parinacota Province
Parinacota, Chile
Parque Arauco S.A.
Parra family
Parral, Chile
Party for Democracy
Paruma
Pascua Lama
Pascua River
Paso Internacional Los Libertadores
Patagon
Patagonia
Patagonian Desert
Patagonian Ice Sheet
Patagonian weasel
Patria Vieja
Patricia Demick
Patricia Verdugo
Patricio Almonacid
Patricio Aylwin
Patricio Contreras
Patricio Galaz
Patricio Lynch
Patricio Manns
Patricio Yáñez
Paul Capdeville
Paul Delano
Paul E. Simons
Paul Schäfer
Paulina Mladinic
Pebre
Pedro Aguirre Cerda
Pedro Aguirre Cerda (municipality)
Pedro Aguirre Cerda, Chile
Pedro Araya (footballer)
Pedro Araya Toro
Pedro de Oña
Pedro de Valdivia
Pedro de Valdivia Bridge
Pedro de Villagra
Pedro Diez Canseco
Pedro Emiliano Muñoz
Pedro Lagos
Pedro Lastra
Pedro Lemebel
Pedro Lucio Cuadra
Pedro Montt
Pedro Opazo
Pedro Reyes (footballer)
Pehoe Lake
Pelarco
Pelarco, Chile
Pelé
Pelluhue
Pelluhue, Chile
Pelotón (reality show)
Pelotón VIP
Pencahue
Pencahue, Chile
Penco
Penco, Chile
Peñalolén
People's Revolutionary Party (Chile)
Peralillo
Perquenco
Perquilauquén
Perquilauquén River
Peru–Bolivian Confederation
Peru–Chile Trench
Peter Kornbluh
Peter Swan (footballer born 1936)
Petorca Province
Peuchen
Peumo
Pica, Chile
Picadillo
Picarones
Picarquín, Chile
Pichanga (food)
Pichidangui
Pichidegua
Pichilemu
Picton, Lennox and Nueva
Picunche
Piedra Roja
Pilgerodendron
Pilolcura
Pincoya
Pingüino de Humboldt National Reserve
Pirate Party of Chile
Pirihueico Lake
Pisagua
Pisagua, Chile
Pisco
Pisco Elqui
Pisco Sour
Pitrufquén
Placilla
Planchón-Peteroa
Playa Ancha University of Educational Sciences
Plaza de la Ciudadanía
Podocarpus nubigenus
Pokémon (subculture)
Politics of Chile
Pomerape
Pongo en tus manos abiertas
Pongo En Tus Manos Abiertas (album)
Pontifical Catholic University of Chile
Pontifical Catholic University of Valparaíso
Popular Socialist Vanguard
Popular Unitary Action Movement
Popular Unity
Porotos con rienda
Portal:Chile
Portillo, Chile
Porvenir, Chile
Postal codes in Chile
Pozo Almonte
President of Chile
Presidente Carlos Ibáñez del Campo International Airport
Presidente Ríos Lake
Pretendiendo
Primavera, Chile
Primera División Chilena 2007
Prince of Wales Country Club
Priwall (barque)
Professor Julio Escudero Base
Progressive Union of the Centrist Center
Project Cybersyn
Project FUBELT
Prostitution in Chile
Providencia (municipality, Chile)
Providencia, Chile
Province of Los Andes, Chile
Provinces of Chile
Provincial Osorno
Prumnopitys andina
Public holidays in Chile
Puchuncaví
Pucón
Pudahuel
Pudú
Puelche
Puelo River
Puente Alto
Puerto Aisén
Puerto Chacabuco
Puerto Cisnes
Puerto del Hambre
Puerto Edén
Puerto Montt
Puerto Natales
Puerto Navarino
Puerto Octay
Puerto Toro
Puerto Varas
Puerto Williams
Pukará de Quitor
Pular (volcano)
Pumalín Park
Pumanque
Puna de Atacama dispute
Puna tinamou
Punitaqui
Punta Arenas
Punta de Lobos
Punucapa
Puqueldón
Purapel River
Purén
Purranque
Putagán
Putagán River
Putagán, Chile
Putre
Puyehue Lake
Puyehue National Park
Puyehue, Chile
Puyehue-Cordón Caulle

Q
Que Cante la Vida
Quechua
Queilén
Quellón
Quemchi
Queulat National Park
Queule
Quilapayún
Quilicura
Quilicura, Chile
Quillota
Quillota Province
Quilpué
Quiltro
Quinamávida, Chile
Quinta de Tilcoco
Quinta Normal
Quinta Normal, Chile
Quirihue
Quiroga (surname)

R
Radal Siete Tazas National Reserve
Radical Democracy Party (Chile)
Radical Party (Chile)
Radio Atardecer
Radio Club de Chile
Radio Cooperativa
Radomiro Tomic
Radomiro Tomić (mine)
Rafael Fernández (fencer)
Rafael Maroto
Rafael Olarra
Ramón Barros Luco
Ramón Cardemil
Ramón Castilla
Ramón Freire
Ramón María Narváez y Campos, 1st Duke of Valencia
Ramón Vinay
Rancagua
Ranco Lake
Ranco Province
Ránquil
Ranquil River
Raoul Ruiz
Rapa Nui (film)
Rapa Nui language
Rapa Nui National Park
Rapanui
Rari, Chile
Rauco
Raul de Ramon
Raúl Ruiz (director)
Raúl Silva Henríquez
Ray Wilson (English footballer)
Recognition of same-sex unions in Chile
Recoleta (municipality)
Recoleta, Chile
Red Televisiva Megavisión
Regionalist Action Party of Chile
Regions of Chile
Reinaldo Navia
Reloncaví Sound
Renaico
Renata Ruiz
Renca
René Ríos Boettiger
René Schneider
Rengo, Chile
Reñaca Beach
Republic of Chile
Republic of North Peru
Republic of South Peru
Requínoa
Retiro, Chile
Rettig Report
Revolutionary Communist Party (Chile)
Revolutionary Left Movement (Chile)
Ricardo Acuña
Ricardo Baeza-Yates
Ricardo Francisco Rojas
Ricardo Lagos
Ricardo Romero (fencer)
Richard Báez
Riesco
Riesco Island
Riñihue Lake
Río Bueno, Chile
Río Claro
Río Claro, Chile
Río Cruces Bridge
Río Grande, Tierra del Fuego
Río Hurtado
Río Negro, Chile
Río Verde, Chile
River Melado
River Purapel
River Putagán
Robert Souper
Robert White (ambassador)
Robert Winthrop Simpson
Roberto Bolaño
Roberto Castillo
Roberto Matta
Roberto Rojas
Roberto Souper
Roberto Viaux
Robinson Crusoe Island
Robledo
Rodolfo Amando Philippi
Rodolfo Parada
Rodolfo Stange
Rodrigo Barrera
Rodrigo Cadiz
Rodrigo de Quiroga
Rodrigo Meléndez
Rodrigo Rojas DeNegri
Rodrigo Ruiz
Rodrigo Tello
Rodrigo Valenzuela
Rodrigo Vargas
Roger Hunt
Rojasfilms
Rolf Wüthrich
Roman Catholic Archdiocese of Puerto Montt
Roman Catholic Diocese of Linares
Roman Catholic Diocese of Orsono
Roman Catholic Diocese of Punta Arenas
Roman Catholic Diocese of Rancagua
Roman Catholic Diocese of San Carlos de Ancud
Roman Catholic Diocese of Talca
Roman Catholicism in Chile
Romeral
Ron Flowers
Ron Springett
Ronald Fuentes
Rongorongo
Roque Sáenz Peña
Rosa Markmann
Rosita Serrano
Roto
Route 203-CH
Route 215-CH
Royal Audiencia of Concepción
Royal Audiencia of Santiago
Royal Governor of Chile
Rugby union in Chile
Rupanco Lake
Russians in Chile

S
S. Cofré
Saavedra, Chile
Sábado Gigante
Sagrada Familia, Chile
Sailors' mutiny
Sala y Gómez
Salamanca, Chile
Salar de Atacama
Salar de Surire Natural Monument
Salto Grande (waterfall)
Salvador Allende
San Antonio Province
San Antonio, Chile
San Bernardo, Chile
San Carlos, Chile
San Clemente, Chile
San Fabián
San Fabián de Alico
San Felipe de Aconcagua Province
San Felipe, Chile
San Fernando, Chile
San Gregorio, Chile
San Javier, Chile
San Joaquín
San José (volcano)
San José de la Mariquina
San Juan Bautista, Chile
San Miguel (municipality)
San Miguel, Chile
San Nicolás, Chile
San Pablo, Chile
San Pedro (Chile volcano)
San Pedro de Atacama
San Quintín Glacier
San Rafael Glacier
San Rafael Lagoon
San Rafael, Chile
San Ramón, Chile
San Rosendo
San Sebastián de la Cruz fort
San Vicente de Tagua Tagua
Sanhattan
Santa Clara (Juan Fernández Islands)
Santa Cruz Department, Chile
Santa Cruz, Chile
Santa Inés
Santa Inés Island
Santa Lucía Hill
Santa María School massacre
Santiago (commune)
Santiago Chile Temple
Santiago College
Santiago Manuel de Alday y Aspée
Santiago meteorite
Santiago Metro
Santiago Metropolitan Region
Santiago Morning
Santiago Province, Chile
Santiago Stock Exchange
Santiago Vera-Rivera
Santiago Wanderers
Santiago – Capital of Chile
Santo Domingo, Chile
Santos Chavez
Saraveca language
Sarmiento Lake
Saul Landau
Saxegothaea
Schneider Doctrine
Schooner Virjen de Covadonga
Scorpion scandal
Scottish Chilean
Scouting and Guiding in Chile
Sebastián González
Sebastián Keitel
Sebastián Pardo
Sebastián Piñera
Sebastián Rozental
Sechura fox
Seguro Obrero massacre
Selknam
Senate of Chile
Sepp Herberger
Serena libre
Sergio Badilla Castillo
Sergio Livingstone
Sergio Ortega (composer)
Sergio Valech
Sergio Villalobos
Serrano class destroyer
Serrano River
Seven Lakes (Chile)
Severino Reija
Sewell, Chile
Sex and Pornography Day
Short-eared dog
Sierra Gorda, Chile
Sierra Nevada (stratovolcano)
Sierra Nevada de Lagunas Bravas
Sierra Velluda
Sierra Vicuña Mackenna
Silvio Marzolini
Simpson River
SISMI
Sky Airline
Slit throats case
Soap bark tree
SOAR telescope
Social Democrat Radical Party
Socialist Party of Chile
Socialist Republic of Chile
Socialist Workers Party (Chile)
Socialist Youth (Chile)
Sociedad Química y Minera de Chile
Socompa
Sodium nitrate
Sol y Lluvia
Solanum crispum
Soledad Alvear
Sonia Tschorne
Sopaipilla
South America
1932 South American Basketball Championship
1934 South American Basketball Championship
1937 South American Basketball Championship
1942 South American Basketball Championship
1943 South American Basketball Championship
1953 South American Basketball Championship
South American gray fox
South American sea lion
South Pacific Ocean
South Temperate Zone
Southern Andean Volcano Observatory
Southern Chile
Southern Cone
Southern Hemisphere
Southern Patagonian Ice Field
Southern pudú
Southern University of Chile
Spanish colonization of the Americas
Spanish conquest of Chile
Spanish conquest of the Inca Empire
Spanish language
Sport in Chile
Stan Anderson
Stefano Delle Chiaie
Stoppani Glacier
Strait of Magellan
Strategy of tension
Supreme Court of Chile
Surfing in Chile
Svatopluk Pluskal
Swiss Chilean

T
South Temperate Zone
Tacna
Tacna-Arica compromise
Tacna–Arica compromise
Tacnazo insurrection
Taitao Peninsula
Talagante Province
Talca
Talca Province
Talcahuano
Taltal
Tangata manu
Tanquetazo
Tarapacá Region
Teatro Municipal (Santiago)
Ted Robledo
Tehuelche
Telecanal
Telecommunications in Chile
Telephone numbers in Chile
Television in Chile
Televisión Nacional de Chile
Temuco
Temuco Catholic University
Ten Ten-Vilu
Tennis tournaments in Chile
Teno
Teresa of Los Andes
Termas de Chillan
Territorial Prelature of Calama
Territorial Prelature of Illapel
Terror archives
Tetragonia
Thais chocolata
The Clinic
The Earthquake in Chile
The Grange School, Santiago
The House of the Spirits
The House of the Spirits (film)
The Obscene Bird of Night
The Road to Maipú
Themo Lobos
Thomas Cochrane, 10th Earl of Dundonald
Tierra del Fuego
Tierra del Fuego Province (Argentina)
Tierra del Fuego Province, Chile
Tiltil
Timaukel
Time in Chile
Timeline of Chilean history
Timeline of relief efforts after the 2010 Chile earthquake
Timeline of Valdivian history
Titanium La Portada
Tito Beltrán
Tocopilla
Tocopilla Province
Todd Temkin
Todos los Santos Lake
Tolhuaca National Park
Toltén
Tom Araya
Tomas Barraza
Tomás Goyoaga
Tomás Hirsch
Tomás Marín de Poveda
Tomás Marín de Poveda, 1st Marquis of Cañada Hermosa
Tomé
Tongoy
Tonka Tomicic
Topic outline of Chile
Toqui
Toro Submarino
Torre Entel
Torrent duck
Torres del Paine National Park
Torres del Paine, Chile
Tortilla de rescoldo
Tourism in Chile
Tranque Puclaro
Tranqui Island
Transantiago
Trans-Pacific Strategic Economic Partnership
Transport in Chile
Transportation in Chile
Trauco
Treaty of Ancón
Treaty of Peace and Friendship of 1984 between Chile and Argentina
Treaty of Tlatelolco
Trial of the Juntas
Tronador
Tropic of Capricorn
Tropics
Tsesungún dialect
Tsesungun language
Tucapel River
Tulor
Tupungatito
Tupungato
TV Chile
TV Senado
TVN (Chile)
TVU
Tyndall Glacier (Chile)

U
UCV TV
Ugni
Última Esperanza Province
Última Esperanza Sound
Unidad Anti-Terrorista
Unidad de Fomento
Unidad Popular
Unión Española
United Liberal Party (Chile)
United Nations
United Provinces of South America
United States intervention in Chile
Universidad Adolfo Ibáñez
Universidad Alberto Hurtado
Universidad Arturo Prat
Universidad Austral de Chile
Universidad Catolica (football club)
Universidad Católica de la Santísima Concepción
Universidad Católica de Temuco
Universidad Católica del Maule
Universidad Católica del Norte
Universidad de Antofagasta
Universidad de Artes, Ciencias y Comunicación
Universidad de Atacama
Universidad de Chile (football club)
Universidad de Chile (university)
Universidad de Concepción
Universidad de La Frontera
Universidad de La Serena
Universidad de las Américas (Chile)
Universidad de los Andes (Chile)
Universidad de Los Lagos
Universidad de Magallanes
Universidad de Playa Ancha de Ciencias de la Educación
Universidad de Talca
Universidad de Tarapacá
Universidad de Valparaíso
Universidad del Bío-Bío
Universidad del Pacifico (Chile)
Universidad Diego Portales
Universidad Gabriela Mistral
Universidad Metropolitana de Ciencias de la Educación
Universidad San Sebastián
Universidad Técnica Federico Santa María
Universidad Tecnológica de Santiago
Universidad Tecnológica Metropolitana
University for the Arts, Sciences, and Communication
University of Antofagasta
University of Atacama
University of Chile
University of Concepción
University of La Frontera
University of La Serena
University of Los Lagos
University of Magallanes
University of Santiago, Chile
University of Talca
University of Tarapacá
University of the Andes, Chile
University of the Bío-Bío
University of Valparaíso
US-Chile Free Trade Agreement
Uspallata Pass

Uwe Seeler

V
Václav Mašek
Valdir Pereira
Valdivia
Valdivia National Reserve
Valdivia Province
Valdivia River
Valdivian Coastal Range
Valdivian Fort System
Valdivian temperate rain forests
Valech Report
Valentin Ivanov
Valentina Vargas
Valeria Ortega
Valle de la Luna (Chile)
Valle Nevado
Vallenar
Valparaíso
Valparaíso bombardment
Valparaíso Province
Valparaíso Region
Vampire bat
Vavá
Veronica Planella
Very Large Telescope
Via X
Vicar (comics)
Vicente Huidobro
Vicente Pérez Rosales National Park
Viceroyalty of Peru
Vichuquén
Víctor Domingo Silva
Víctor Jara
Víctor Jara (album)
Víctor Olea Alegría
Vicuña
Viedma Lake
Vigatec (Chile)
Vigilante (band)
Viktor Ponedelnik
Viliam Schrojf
Villa Alegre, Chile
Villa Baviera
Villa Grimaldi
Villa Las Estrellas
Villa O'Higgins
Villa Tehuelches
Villarrica (volcano)
Villarrica Lake
Villarrica National Park
Villarrica, Chile
Viña del Mar
Viña del Mar International Song Festival
Violeta Parra
Virgilio Paz Romero
Visa policy of Chile
Visa requirements for Chilean citizens
Visviri
Vitacura
Vittorio Corbo
Viviana Díaz
Vizcachas Mountains
Volcán Isluga National Park
Volcán Osorno
Volcanism of Chile
Volodia Teitelboim
VTR Chile
VTR Globalcom
Vuelta Ciclista de Chile
Vuelta Ciclista Por Un Chile Lider

W
Wallatiri
Walter Winterbottom
War of the Confederation
War of the Pacific
Water privatization in Chile
Water supply and sanitation in Chile
Water trading
Wellington Island
Welsh Chilean
Western Hemisphere
Western Hemisphere Institute for Security Cooperation

WikiLosRios
Wikipedia:WikiProject Topic outline/Drafts/Topic outline of Chile
Williamson-Balfour Company
Willy Topp
Willys FAMAE Corvo
Wisetrack
Witches of Chiloé
Workers' United Center of Chile
Wulff Castle

X
Ximena Huilipán

Y
Yaghan language
Yanteles
Yareta
Yate (volcano)
Yelcho Lake
Yerbas Buenas
Yoya Martínez
Yumbel
Yungay, Chile

Z
Zapaleri
Zona Austral
Zona Central, Chile
Zona Latina
Zona Sur
Zózimo

See also

List of international rankings
Lists of country-related topics
Topic outline of Chile
Topic outline of geography
Topic outline of South America
United Nations

External links

 
Chile